Creully is a former commune in the Calvados department in the Normandy region in northwestern France. On 1 January 2017, it was merged into the new commune Creully sur Seulles.

The town square is named after Canadian Lieutenant Bill McCormick of the 1st Hussars Canadian Armoured Regiment (London, Ontario). Lt. McCormick was the only Allied soldier to reach his D-Day objective when on 6 June 1944, after the tank he commanded passed through Creully, it reached the Caen-Bayeux road.

Population

See also
Communes of the Calvados department
Château de Creully

References

Former communes of Calvados (department)
Calvados communes articles needing translation from French Wikipedia
Populated places disestablished in 2017